is a Prefectural Natural Park in the mountains of western Shiga Prefecture, Japan. Established in 1971, the park spans the borders of the municipalities of Ōtsu and Takashima.

See also
 National Parks of Japan
 Biwako Quasi-National Park

References

External links
 Map of the Natural Parks in Shiga Prefecture (marked in green)

Parks and gardens in Shiga Prefecture
Protected areas established in 1971
1971 establishments in Japan